The women's 50 metre freestyle competition at the 2014 Pan Pacific Swimming Championships took place on August 24 at the Gold Coast Aquatic Centre.  The last champion was Jessica Hardy of US.

This race consisted of one length of the pool in freestyle.

Records
Prior to this competition, the existing world and Pan Pacific records were as follows:

Results
All times are in minutes and seconds.

Heats
The first round was held on August 24, at 11:07.

B Final 
The B final was held on August 24, at 20:24.

A Final 
The A final was held on August 24, at 20:24.

References

2014 Pan Pacific Swimming Championships
2014 in women's swimming